Cannikin was an underground nuclear weapons test performed on November 6, 1971, on Amchitka island, Alaska, by the United States Atomic Energy Commission.  The experiment, part of the Operation Grommet nuclear test series, tested the unique W71 warhead design for the LIM-49 Spartan anti-ballistic missile.  With an explosive yield of almost , the test was the largest underground explosion ever detonated by the United States.

Prior to the main five-megaton test in 1971, a  test took place on the island on October 2, 1969, for calibration purposes, and to ensure the subsequent Cannikin test could be contained. This test, Milrow, was included in the Operation Mandrel nuclear test series.

The Cannikin test faced considerable opposition on environmental grounds. The campaigning environmental organization Greenpeace grew out of efforts to oppose the test.

Siting
The Cannikin test was too large to be conducted safely in Nevada.  Amchitka had been considered in the 1950s as a potential nuclear test site, but had been deemed unsuitable at that time.  In 1965, a single nuclear test, Long Shot, was carried out on the island for the purposes of seismic test detection development, under program Vela Uniform.

Preparation
Preparation for the test took place over five years and involved hundreds of staff from the Lawrence Radiation Laboratory, later the Lawrence Livermore National Laboratory. Drilling for the shaft for the Milrow test began in March 1967, with drilling for the Cannikin test commencing in August 1967.

The chairman of the Atomic Energy Commission, James R. Schlesinger, brought his wife and two daughters to Amchitka for the test to emphasize the safety of the test.

Opposition
Both the 1969 calibration test and Cannikin itself attracted protest. Because of the 1964 Alaska earthquake, the plans raised concerns that tests might trigger earthquakes and cause a tsunami. A 1969 demonstration of 7,000 people blocked a major U.S.–Canada border crossing in British Columbia, carrying signs reading "Don't Make A Wave. It's Your Fault If Our Fault Goes". Further demonstrations occurred at Canada–US border crossings in Ontario and Quebec.  The Canadian Don't Make a Wave Committee, founded that year in Vancouver, attempted to halt further nuclear testing on the Aleutian Islands chain. With the intention of sailing to Amchitka to protest the 1971 test, the committee chartered a ship it renamed Greenpeace.   During the voyage to Amchitka, the test was delayed a month. The ship was turned back by the U.S. Coast Guard, although a letter given to the Greenpeace crew showed support of the protest by some on the intervening Coast Guard ship. Under the Greenpeace name, the organization created for the protest continued to exist as the campaigning environmental organization Greenpeace.

In July 1971, the anti-nuclear Committee for Nuclear Responsibility filed suit against the Atomic Energy Commission, asking the court to stop the test. The suit was unsuccessful, with the Supreme Court denying the injunction by 4 votes to 3.  The test was carried out and did not cause a tsunami as feared.

See also
Military history of the Aleutian Islands

References

External links

Underground nuclear weapons testing